Freight transport, also referred as freight forwarding, is the physical process of transporting commodities and merchandise goods and cargo. The term shipping originally referred to transport by sea but in American English, it has been extended to refer to transport by land or air (International English: "carriage") as well.  "Logistics", a term borrowed from the military environment, is also used in the same sense.

Modes of shipment

In 2015, 108 trillion tonne-kilometers were transported worldwide (anticipated to grow by 3.4% per year until 2050 (128 Trillion in 2020)): 70% by sea, 18% by road, 9% by rail, 2% by inland waterways and less than 0.25% by air.

Grounds

Land or "ground" shipping can be made by train or by truck (British English: lorry). Ground transport is typically more affordable than air, but more expensive than sea, especially in developing countries, where inland infrastructure may not be efficient. In air and sea shipments, ground transport is required to take the cargo from its place of origin to the airport or seaport and then to its destination because it is not always possible to establish a production facility near ports due to the limited coastlines of countries.

Ship

Much freight transport is done by cargo ships. An individual nation's fleet and the people that crew it are referred to as its merchant navy or merchant marine. According to a 2018 report from the United Nations Conference on Trade and Development (UNCTAD), merchant shipping (or seaborne trade) carries 80-90% of international trade and 60-70% by value. On rivers and canals, barges are often used to carry bulk cargo.

Air

Cargo is transported by air in specialized cargo aircraft and in the luggage compartments of passenger aircraft. Air freight is typically the fastest mode for long-distance freight transport but it is also the most expensive.

Multimodal

Cargo is exchanged between different modes of transportation via transport hubs, also known as transport interchanges or nodes (e.g. train stations, airports, etc.). Cargo is shipped under a single contract but performed using at least two different modes of transport (e.g. ground and air). Cargo may not be containerized.

Intermodal

Multimodal transport featuring containerized cargo (or intermodal container) that is easily transferred between ship, rail, plane and truck.

For example, a shipper works together with both ground and air transportation to ship an item overseas. Intermodal freight transport is used to plan the route and carry out the shipping service from the manufacturer to the door of the recipient.

Terms of shipment 

The Incoterms (or International Commercial Terms) published by the International Chamber of Commerce (ICC) are accepted by governments, legal authorities, and practitioners worldwide for the interpretation of the most commonly used terms in international trade. Common terms include:

 Free on Board (FOB)
 Cost and Freight (CFR, C&F, CNF)
 Cost, Insurance and Freight (CIF)

The term "best way" generally implies that the shipper will choose the carrier who offers the lowest rate (to the shipper) for the shipment. In some cases, however, other factors, such as better insurance or faster transit time will cause the shipper to choose an option other than the lowest bidder.

Door-to-door shipping
Door-to-door (DTD or D2D) shipping refers to the domestic or international shipment of cargo from the point of origin (POI) to the destination while generally remaining on the same piece of equipment and avoiding multiple transactions, transloading, and cross-docking without interim storage.

International DTD is a service provided by many international shipping companies and may feature intermodal freight transport using containerized cargo. The quoted price of this service includes all shipping, handling, import and customs duties, making it a hassle-free option for customers to import goods from one jurisdiction to another. This is compared to standard shipping, the price of which typically includes only the expenses incurred by the shipping company in transferring the object from one place to another. Customs fees, import taxes and other tariffs may contribute substantially to this base price before the item ever arrives.

See also 

 Affreightment
 Automatic Identification System
 Mid-stream operation
 Outline of transport
 Ship transport
 Rail transport
 Transshipment
 Greek shipping
 Chinese shipping
 Environmental issues with shipping
 List of cargo types
 Right of way (shipping)
 Shipping markets
 Full container load (FCL)
 Less than container load (LCL)

References

Citations

External links

 Schreiber, Zvi 2016: The Year Freight Goes Online. December 2015
 Humplik, Carmen Winds of change in freight transportation supply chain: Platooning technology. July 2017
 Bloomberg.com First Cryptocurrency Freight Deal Takes Russian Wheat to Turkey. January 2018

 
Economic globalization
Intermodal containers
Merchant navy